Route 209 is a collector road in the Canadian province of Nova Scotia.

It is located in Cumberland County and follows the shoreline of the Bay of Fundy, connecting Parrsboro with River Hebert. The linked communities are known as the Parrsboro Shore.

It is designated as part of the Fundy Shore Scenic Drive. Highway 209 was formerly designated as Trunk Highway 9.

Communities

Parrsboro
Kirkhill
Wharton
Diligent River
Fox River
Port Greville
Wards Brook
Brookville
East Fraserville
Fraserville
Spencer's Island

East Advocate
Advocate Harbour
Point Hill
New Salem
Apple River
East Apple River
Sand River
Shulie
Two Rivers
Joggins

Parks
Cape Chignecto Provincial Park
Chignecto Game Sanctuary

History

The section of Collector Highway 209 from Parrsboro to Apple River was once designated as Trunk Highway 9.

See also
List of Nova Scotia provincial highways

References

Roads in Cumberland County, Nova Scotia
Nova Scotia provincial highways